Ikwerre may refer to:

Ikwerre people
Ikwerre language
Ikwerre, Rivers, Nigeria

Language and nationality disambiguation pages